Colegio Suizo de Santiago is a Swiss international school in Ñuñoa, Santiago de Chile. It serves students from preschool through senior high school.

It was founded in 1939.

References

External links
 Colegio Suizo de Santiago 
 Colegio Suizo de Santiago 

Swiss international schools
International schools in Santiago, Chile
1939 establishments in Chile
Educational institutions established in 1939